State Route 285 (SR 285) is a  route that serves as a connection between US 431 at Lakepoint State Park to SR 165 north of Wylaunee in eastern Barbour County. The entire route is known as Old Highway 165 for its entire length, as it is a former alignment of SR 165.

Route description
The southern terminus of SR 285 is located at its intersection with US 431 at Lakepoint State Park. From this point the route travels in an easterly direction prior to turning to the northeast en route to its northern terminus at SR 165.

Major intersections

References

External links

285
Transportation in Barbour County, Alabama